Ulyanovka is a rural locality (a village) in Nikolayevsky Selsoviet, Karmaskalinsky District, Bashkortostan, Russia. The population was 100 as of 2010. There is 1 street.

Geography 
Ulyanovka is located 10 km north of Karmaskaly (the district's administrative centre) by road. Nikolayevka is the nearest rural locality.

References 

Rural localities in Karmaskalinsky District